The 2018 United States House of Representatives elections were held on November 6, 2018, with early voting taking place in some states in the weeks preceding that date. Voters chose representatives from all 435 congressional districts across each of the 50 U.S. states. Non-voting delegates from the District of Columbia and four of the five inhabited U.S. territories were also elected. These midterm elections took place nearly halfway through the first term of Republican President Donald Trump. The winners will serve in the 116th United States Congress, with seats apportioned among the states based on the 2010 United States census. On Election Day, Republicans had held a House majority since January 2011 as a result of the 2010 elections.

In the 2018 midterm elections, the Democrats won control of the House and had a net gain of more than 40 seats from their total after the 2016 elections (including one seat gained previously with Conor Lamb's March 2018 special election victory). This was their largest gain of seats since the 1974 elections, when they picked up 49 seats.

Election ratings

Latest published ratings for competitive seats 
Several sites and individuals publish ratings of competitive seats. The seats listed below were considered competitive (not "safe" or "solid") by at least one of the rating groups. These ratings are based upon factors such as the strength of the incumbent (if the incumbent is running for re-election), the strength of the candidates, and the partisan history of the district (the Cook Partisan Voting Index is one example of this metric). Each rating describes the likelihood of a given outcome in the election.

Most election ratings use:
Tossup: no advantage
Tilt (sometimes used): slight advantage
Lean: clear advantage
Likely or favored: strong, but not certain advantage
Safe or solid: outcome is nearly certain

<div style="overflow-x:auto;>
{| class="wikitable sortable" style="text-align:center"

|- valign=bottom
! District
! CPVI
! class="unsortable" |Incumbent
! Previousresult
! Cook
! I.E.
! Sab.
! RCP
! Daily Kos
! 538
! Winner

|-
! 
|  data-sort-value=9 | R+9
|  | Don Young (R)
|  data-sort-value=50.3 | 50.3% R
| 
| 
| 
| 
| 
| 
| data-sort-value=1  | Don Young (R)

|-
! 
|  data-sort-value=2 | R+2
|  | Tom O'Halleran (D)
|  data-sort-value=-50.7 | 50.7% D
| 
| 
| 
| 
| 
| 
| data-sort-value=-1  | Tom O'Halleran (D)

|-
! 
|  data-sort-value=1 | R+1
|  | Martha McSally (R) 
|  data-sort-value=57.0 | 57.0% R
| 
| 
| 
| 
| 
| 
| data-sort-value=-1  | Ann Kirkpatrick (D)

|-
! 
|  data-sort-value=9 | R+9
|  | David Schweikert (R)
|  data-sort-value=62.1 | 62.1% R
| 
| 
| 
| 
| 
| 
| data-sort-value=1  | David Schweikert (R)

|-
! 
|  data-sort-value=13 | R+13
|  | Debbie Lesko (R)
|  data-sort-value=52.4 | 52.4% R
| 
| 
| 
| 
| 
| 
| data-sort-value=1  | Debbie Lesko (R)

|-
! 
|  data-sort-value=-4 | D+4
|  | Kyrsten Sinema (D) 
|  data-sort-value=-60.9 | 60.9% D
| 
| 
| 
| 
| 
| 
| data-sort-value=-1  | Greg Stanton (D)

|-
! 
|  data-sort-value=7 | R+7
|  | French Hill (R)
|  data-sort-value=58.4 | 58.4% R
| 
| 
| 
| 
| 
| 
| data-sort-value=1  | French Hill (R)

|-
! data-sort-value="California 0" |
|  data-sort-value=11 | R+11
|  | Doug LaMalfa (R)
|  data-sort-value=59.1 | 59.1% R
| 
| 
| 
| 
| 
| 
| data-sort-value=1  | Doug LaMalfa (R)

|-
! data-sort-value="California 0" |
|  data-sort-value=10 | R+10
|  | Tom McClintock (R)
|  data-sort-value=62.7 | 62.7% R
| 
| 
| 
| 
| 
| 
| data-sort-value=1  | Tom McClintock (R)

|-
! data-sort-value="California 0" |
|  data-sort-value=-3 | D+3
|  | Ami Bera (D)
|  data-sort-value=-51.2 | 51.2% D
| 
| 
| 
| 
| 
| 
| data-sort-value=-1  | Ami Bera (D)

|-
! 
| data-sort-value=0 | EVEN
|  | Jeff Denham (R)
|  data-sort-value=51.7 | 51.7% R
| 
| 
| 
| 
| 
| 
| data-sort-value=-1  | Josh Harder (D)

|-
! 
|  data-sort-value=-9 | D+9
|  | Jim Costa (D)
|  data-sort-value=-58.0 | 58.0% D
| 
| 
| 
| 
| 
| 
| data-sort-value=-1  | Jim Costa (D)

|-
! 
|  data-sort-value=-5 | D+5
|  | David Valadao (R)
|  data-sort-value=56.7 | 56.7% R
| 
| 
| 
| 
| 
| 
| data-sort-value=-1  | TJ Cox (D)

|-
! 
|  data-sort-value=8 | R+8
|  | Devin Nunes (R)
|  data-sort-value=67.6 | 67.6% R
| 
| 
| 
| 
| 
| 
| data-sort-value=1  | Devin Nunes (R)

|-
! 
|  data-sort-value=-7 | D+7
|  | Salud Carbajal (D)
|  data-sort-value=-53.4 | 53.4% D
| 
| 
| 
| 
| 
| 
| data-sort-value=-1  | Salud Carbajal (D)

|-
! 
| data-sort-value=0 | EVEN
|  | Steve Knight (R)
|  data-sort-value=53.1 | 53.1% R
| 
| 
| 
| 
| 
| 
| data-sort-value=-1  | Katie Hill (D)

|-
! 
| data-sort-value=0 | EVEN
|  | Ed Royce (R) 
|  data-sort-value=57.2 | 57.2% R
| 
| 
| 
| 
| 
| 
| data-sort-value=-1  | Gil Cisneros (D)

|-
! 
|  data-sort-value=3 | R+3
|  | Mimi Walters (R)
|  data-sort-value=58.6 | 58.6% R
| 
| 
| 
| 
| 
| 
| data-sort-value=-1  | Katie Porter (D)

|-
! 
|  data-sort-value=4 | R+4
|  | Dana Rohrabacher (R)
|  data-sort-value=58.3 | 58.3% R
| 
| 
| 
| 
| 
| 
| data-sort-value=-1  | Harley Rouda (D)

|-
! 
|  data-sort-value=1 | R+1
|  | Darrell Issa (R) 
|  data-sort-value=50.3 | 50.3% R
| 
| 
| 
| 
| 
| 
| data-sort-value=-1  | Mike Levin (D)

|-
! 
|  data-sort-value=11 | R+11
|  | Duncan D. Hunter (R)
|  data-sort-value=63.5.0 | 63.5% R
| 
| 
| 
| 
| 
| 
| data-sort-value=1  | Duncan D. Hunter (R)

|-
! 
|  data-sort-value=6 | R+6
|  | Scott Tipton (R)
|  data-sort-value=54.6 | 54.6% R
| 
| 
| 
| 
| 
| 
| data-sort-value=1  | Scott Tipton (R)

|-
! 
|  data-sort-value=-2 | D+2
|  | Mike Coffman (R)
|  data-sort-value=50.9 | 50.9% R
| 
| 
| 
| 
| 
| 
| data-sort-value=-1  | Jason Crow (D)

|-
! data-sort-value="Florida 0" |
|  data-sort-value=7 | R+7
| Vacant
|  data-sort-value=58.6 | 58.6% R
| 
| 
| 
| 
| 
| 
| data-sort-value=1  | Michael Waltz (R)

|-
! data-sort-value="Florida 0" |
| data-sort-value=0 | EVEN
|  | Stephanie Murphy (D)
|  data-sort-value=-51.5 | 51.5% D
| 
| 
| 
| 
| 
| 
| data-sort-value=-1  | Stephanie Murphy (D)

|-
! 
|  data-sort-value=-2 | D+2
|  | Charlie Crist (D)
|  data-sort-value=-51.9 | 51.9% D
| 
| 
| 
| 
| 
| 
| data-sort-value=-1  | Charlie Crist (D)

|-
! 
|  data-sort-value=6 | R+6
|  | Dennis A. Ross (R) 
|  data-sort-value=57.5 | 57.5% R
| 
| 
| 
| 
| 
| 
| data-sort-value=1  | Ross Spano (R)

|-
! 
|  data-sort-value=7 | R+7
|  | Vern Buchanan (R)
|  data-sort-value=59.8 | 59.8% R
| 
| 
| 
| 
| 
| 
| data-sort-value=1  | Vern Buchanan (R)

|-
! 
|  data-sort-value=5 | R+5
|  | Brian Mast (R)
|  data-sort-value=53.6 | 53.6% R
| 
| 
| 
| 
| 
| 
| data-sort-value=1  | Brian Mast (R)

|-
! 
|  data-sort-value=4 | R+4
|  | Mario Díaz-Balart (R)
|  data-sort-value=62.4 | 62.4% R
| 
| 
| 
| 
| 
| 
| data-sort-value=1  | Mario Díaz-Balart (R)

|-
! 
|  data-sort-value=-6 | D+6
|  | Carlos Curbelo (R)
|  data-sort-value=53.0 | 53.0% R
| 
| 
| 
| 
| 
| 
| data-sort-value=-1  | Debbie Mucarsel-Powell (D)

|-
! 
|  data-sort-value=-5 | D+5
|  | Ileana Ros-Lehtinen (R) 
|  data-sort-value=54.9 | 54.9% R
| 
| 
| 
| 
| 
| 
| data-sort-value=-1  | Donna Shalala (D)

|-
! 
|  data-sort-value=8 | R+8
|  | Karen Handel (R)
|  data-sort-value=51.8 | 51.8% R
| 
| 
| 
| 
| 
| 
| data-sort-value=-1  | Lucy McBath (D)

|-
! 
|  data-sort-value=9 | R+9
|  | Rob Woodall (R)
|  data-sort-value=60.4 | 60.4% R
| 
| 
| 
| 
| 
| 
| data-sort-value=1  | Rob Woodall (R)

|-
! data-sort-value="Illinois 0" |
|  data-sort-value=2 | R+2
|  | Peter Roskam (R)
|  data-sort-value=59.2 | 59.2% R
| 
| 
| 
| 
| 
| 
| data-sort-value=-1  | Sean Casten (D)

|-
! 
|  data-sort-value=5 | R+5
|  | Mike Bost (R)
|  data-sort-value=54.3 | 54.3% R
| 
| 
| 
| 
| 
| 
| data-sort-value=1  | Mike Bost (R)

|-
! 
|  data-sort-value=3 | R+3
|  | Rodney Davis (R)
|  data-sort-value=59.7 | 59.7% R
| 
| 
| 
| 
| 
| 
| data-sort-value=1  | Rodney Davis (R)

|-
! 
|  data-sort-value=5 | R+5
|  | Randy Hultgren (R)
|  data-sort-value=59.3 | 59.3% R
| 
| 
| 
| 
| 
| 
| data-sort-value=-1  | Lauren Underwood (D)

|-
! 
|  data-sort-value=11 | R+11
|  | Jackie Walorski (R)
|  data-sort-value=59.3 | 59.3% R
| 
| 
| 
| 
| 
| 
| data-sort-value=1  | Jackie Walorski (R)

|-
! 
|  data-sort-value=13 | R+13
|  | Trey Hollingsworth (R)
|  data-sort-value=54.1 | 54.1% R
| 
| 
| 
| 
| 
| 
| data-sort-value=1  | Trey Hollingsworth (R)

|-
! 
|  data-sort-value=-1 | D+1
|  | Rod Blum (R)
|  data-sort-value=53.7 | 53.7% R
| 
| 
| 
| 
| 
| 
| data-sort-value=-1  | Abby Finkenauer (D)

|-
! 
|  data-sort-value=-1 | D+1
|  | Dave Loebsack (D)
|  data-sort-value=-53.7 | 53.7% D
| 
| 
| 
| 
| 
| 
| data-sort-value=-1  | Dave Loebsack (D)

|-
! 
|  data-sort-value=1 | R+1
|  | David Young (R)
|  data-sort-value=53.5 | 53.5% R
| 
| 
| 
| 
| 
| 
| data-sort-value=-1  | Cindy Axne (D)

|-
! 
|  data-sort-value=11 | R+11
|  | Steve King (R)
|  data-sort-value=61.2 | 61.2% R
| 
| 
| 
| 
| 
| 
| data-sort-value=1  | Steve King (R)

|-
! 
|  data-sort-value=10 | R+10
|  | Lynn Jenkins (R) 
|  data-sort-value=60.9 | 60.9% R
| 
| 
| 
| 
| 
| 
| data-sort-value=1  | Steve Watkins (R)

|-
! 
|  data-sort-value=4 | R+4
|  | Kevin Yoder (R)
|  data-sort-value=51.3 | 51.3% R
| 
| 
| 
| 
| 
| 
| data-sort-value=-1  | Sharice Davids (D)

|-
! 
|  data-sort-value=9 | R+9
|  | Andy Barr (R)
|  data-sort-value=61.1 | 61.1% R
| 
| 
| 
| 
| 
| 
| data-sort-value=1  | Andy Barr (R)

|-
! 
|  data-sort-value=2 | R+2
|  | Bruce Poliquin (R)
|  data-sort-value=54.8 | 54.8% R
| 
| 
| 
| 
| 
| 
| data-sort-value=-1 | Jared Golden (D)

|-
! data-sort-value="Michigan 0" |
|  data-sort-value=9 | R+9
|  | Jack Bergman (R)
|  data-sort-value=54.9 | 54.9% R
| 
| 
| 
| 
| 
| 
| data-sort-value=1  | Jack Bergman (R)

|-
! data-sort-value="Michigan 0" |
|  data-sort-value=9 | R+9
|  | Bill Huizenga (R)
|  data-sort-value=62.6 | 62.6% R
| 
| 
| 
| 
| 
| 
| data-sort-value=1  | Bill Huizenga (R)

|-
! data-sort-value="Michigan 0" |
|  data-sort-value=6 | R+6
|  | Justin Amash (R)
|  data-sort-value=59.5 | 59.5% R
| 
| 
| 
| 
| 
| 
| data-sort-value=1  | Justin Amash (R)

|-
! data-sort-value="Michigan 0" |
|  data-sort-value=4 | R+4
|  | Fred Upton (R)
|  data-sort-value=58.7 | 58.7% R
| 
| 
| 
| 
| 
| 
| data-sort-value=1  | Fred Upton (R)

|-
! data-sort-value="Michigan 0" |
|  data-sort-value=7 | R+7
|  | Tim Walberg (R)
|  data-sort-value=55.1 | 55.1% R
| 
| 
| 
| 
| 
| 
| data-sort-value=1  | Tim Walberg (R)

|-
! data-sort-value="Michigan 0" |
|  data-sort-value=4 | R+4
|  | Mike Bishop (R)
|  data-sort-value=56.0 | 56.0% R
| 
| 
| 
| 
| 
| 
| data-sort-value=-1  | Elissa Slotkin (D)

|-
! 
|  data-sort-value=4 | R+4
|  | Dave Trott (R) 
|  data-sort-value=52.9 | 52.9% R
| 
| 
| 
| 
| 
| 
| data-sort-value=-1  | Haley Stevens (D)

|-
! 
|  data-sort-value=5 | R+5
|  | Tim Walz (D) 
|  data-sort-value=-50.3 | 50.3% D
| 
| 
| 
| 
| 
| 
| data-sort-value=1  | Jim Hagedorn (R)

|-
! 
|  data-sort-value=2 | R+2
|  | Jason Lewis (R)
|  data-sort-value=47.0 | 47.0% R
| 
| 
| 
| 
| 
| 
| data-sort-value=-1  | Angie Craig (D)

|-
! 
|  data-sort-value=-1 | D+1
|  | Erik Paulsen (R)
|  data-sort-value=56.7 | 56.7% R
| 
| 
| 
| 
| 
| 
| data-sort-value=-1  | Dean Phillips (D)

|-
! 
|  data-sort-value=12 | R+12
|  | Collin Peterson (D)
|  data-sort-value=-52.5 | 52.5% D
| 
| 
| 
| 
| 
| 
| data-sort-value=-1  | Collin Peterson (D)

|-
! 
|  data-sort-value=4 | R+4
|  | Rick Nolan (D) 
|  data-sort-value=-50.2 | 50.2% D
| 
| 
| 
| 
| 
| 
| data-sort-value=1  | Pete Stauber (R)

|-
! 
|  data-sort-value=8 | R+8
|  | Ann Wagner (R)
|  data-sort-value=58.5 | 58.5% R
| 
| 
| 
| 
| 
| 
| data-sort-value=1  | Ann Wagner (R)

|-
! 
|  data-sort-value=11 | R+11
|  | Greg Gianforte (R)
|  data-sort-value=49.9 | 49.9% R
| 
| 
| 
| 
| 
| 
| data-sort-value=1  | Greg Gianforte (R)

|-
! 
|  data-sort-value=4 | R+4
|  | Don Bacon (R)
|  data-sort-value=48.9 | 48.9% R
| 
| 
| 
| 
| 
| 
| data-sort-value=1  | Don Bacon (R)

|-
! 
|  data-sort-value=2 | R+2
|  | Jacky Rosen (D) 
|  data-sort-value=-47.2 | 47.2% D
| 
| 
| 
| 
| 
| 
| data-sort-value=-1  | Susie Lee (D)

|-
! 
|  data-sort-value=-3 | D+3
|  | Ruben Kihuen (D) 
|  data-sort-value=-48.5 | 48.5% D
| 
| 
| 
| 
| 
| 
| data-sort-value=-1  | Steven Horsford (D)

|-
! 
|  data-sort-value=2 | R+2
|  | Carol Shea-Porter (D) 
|  data-sort-value=-44.3 | 44.3% D
| 
| 
| 
| 
| 
| 
| data-sort-value=-1  | Chris Pappas (D)

|-
! 
|  data-sort-value=-2 | D+2
|  | Ann McLane Kuster (D)
|  data-sort-value=-49.8 | 49.8% D
| 
| 
| 
| 
| 
| 
| data-sort-value=-1  | Ann McLane Kuster (D)

|-
! data-sort-value="New Jersey 0" |
|  data-sort-value=1 | R+1
|  | Frank LoBiondo (R) 
|  data-sort-value=59.2 | 59.2% R
| 
| 
| 
| 
| 
| 
| data-sort-value=-1  | Jeff Van Drew (D)

|-
! data-sort-value="New Jersey 0" |
|  data-sort-value=2 | R+2
|  | Tom MacArthur (R)
|  data-sort-value=59.3 | 59.3% R
| 
| 
| 
| 
| 
| 
| data-sort-value=-1  | Andy Kim (D)

|-
! data-sort-value="New Jersey 0" |
|  data-sort-value=8 | R+8
|  | Chris Smith (R)
|  data-sort-value=63.7 | 63.7% R
| 
| 
| 
| 
| 
| 
| data-sort-value=1  | Chris Smith (R)

|-
! data-sort-value="New Jersey 0" |
|  data-sort-value=3 | R+3
|  | Josh Gottheimer (D)
|  data-sort-value=-51.1 | 51.1% D
| 
| 
| 
| 
| 
| 
| data-sort-value=-1  | Josh Gottheimer (D)

|-
! data-sort-value="New Jersey 0" |
|  data-sort-value=3 | R+3
|  | Leonard Lance (R)
|  data-sort-value=54.1 | 54.1% R
| 
| 
| 
| 
| 
| 
| data-sort-value=-1  | Tom Malinowski (D)

|-
! 
|  data-sort-value=3 | R+3
|  | Rodney Frelinghuysen (R) 
|  data-sort-value=58.0 | 58.0% R
| 
| 
| 
| 
| 
| 
| data-sort-value=-1  | Mikie Sherrill (D)

|-
! 
|  data-sort-value=-7 | D+7
|  | Michelle Lujan Grisham (D) 
|  data-sort-value=-65.1 | 65.1% D
| 
| 
| 
| 
| 
| 
| data-sort-value=-1  | Deb Haaland (D)

|-
! 
|  data-sort-value=6 | R+6
|  | Steve Pearce (R) 
|  data-sort-value=62.7 | 62.7% R
| 
| 
| 
| 
| 
| 
| data-sort-value=-1  | Xochitl Torres Small (D)

|-
! data-sort-value="New York 0" |
|  data-sort-value=5 | R+5
|  | Lee Zeldin (R)
|  data-sort-value=58.2 | 58.2% R
| 
| 
| 
| 
| 
| 
| data-sort-value=1  | Lee Zeldin (R)

|-
! data-sort-value="New York 0" |
|  data-sort-value=3 | R+3
|  | Peter King (R)
|  data-sort-value=57.2 | 57.2% R
| 
| 
| 
| 
| 
| 
| data-sort-value=1  | Peter King (R)

|-
! data-sort-value="New York 0" |
|  data-sort-value=-1 | D+1
|  | Thomas Suozzi (D)
|  data-sort-value=-52.4 | 52.4% D
| 
| 
| 
| 
| 
| 
| data-sort-value=-1  | Thomas Suozzi (D)

|-
! 
|  data-sort-value=3 | R+3
|  | Dan Donovan (R)
|  data-sort-value=61.5 | 61.5% R
| 
| 
| 
| 
| 
| 
| data-sort-value=-1  | Max Rose (D)

|-
! 
|  data-sort-value=1 | R+1
|  | Sean Patrick Maloney (D)
|  data-sort-value=-55.6 | 55.6% D
| 
| 
| 
| 
| 
| 
| data-sort-value=-1  | Sean Patrick Maloney (D)

|-
! 
|  data-sort-value=2 | R+2
|  | John Faso (R)
|  data-sort-value=54.0 | 54.0% R
| 
| 
| 
| 
| 
| 
| data-sort-value=-1  | Antonio Delgado (D)

|-
! data-sort-value="New York 0" |
|  data-sort-value=4 | R+4
|  | Elise Stefanik (R)
|  data-sort-value=61.6 | 61.6% R
| 
| 
| 
| 
| 
| 
| data-sort-value=1  | Elise Stefanik (R)

|-
! 
|  data-sort-value=6 | R+6
|  | Claudia Tenney (R)
|  data-sort-value=46.5 | 46.5% R
| 
| 
| 
| 
| 
| 
| data-sort-value=1  | Anthony Brindisi (D)

|-
! 
|  data-sort-value=6 | R+6
|  | Tom Reed (R)
|  data-sort-value=57.6 | 57.6% R
| 
| 
| 
| 
| 
| 
| data-sort-value=1  | Tom Reed (R)

|-
! 
|  data-sort-value=-3 | D+3
|  | John Katko (R)
|  data-sort-value=60.5 | 60.5% R
| 
| 
| 
| 
| 
| 
| data-sort-value=1  | John Katko (R)

|-
! 
|  data-sort-value=11 | R+11
|  | Chris Collins (R)
|  data-sort-value=67.2 | 67.2% R
| 
| 
| 
| 
| 
| 
| data-sort-value=1  | Chris Collins (R)

|-
! data-sort-value="North Carolina 0" |
|  data-sort-value=7 | R+7
|  | George Holding (R)
|  data-sort-value=56.7 | 56.7% R
| 
| 
| 
| 
| 
| 
| data-sort-value=1  | George Holding (R)

|-
! data-sort-value="North Carolina 0" |
|  data-sort-value=9 | R+9
|  | Mark Walker (R)
|  data-sort-value=59.2 | 59.2% R
| 
| 
| 
| 
| 
| 
| data-sort-value=1  | Mark Walker (R)

|-
! data-sort-value="North Carolina 0" |
|  data-sort-value=9 | R+9
|  | David Rouzer (R)
|  data-sort-value=60.9 | 60.9% R
| 
| 
| 
| 
| 
| 
| data-sort-value=1  | David Rouzer (R)

|-
! data-sort-value="North Carolina 0" |
|  data-sort-value=8 | R+8
|  | Richard Hudson (R)
|  data-sort-value=58.8 | 58.8% R
| 
| 
| 
| 
| 
| 
| data-sort-value=1  | Richard Hudson (R)

|-
! data-sort-value="North Carolina 0" |
|  data-sort-value=8 | R+8
|  | Robert Pittenger (R) 
|  data-sort-value=58.2 | 58.2% R
| 
| 
| 
| 
| 
| 
| data-sort-value=0  | Election voided.

|-
! 
|  data-sort-value=6 | R+6
|  | Ted Budd (R)
|  data-sort-value=56.1 | 56.1% R
| 
| 
| 
| 
| 
| 
| data-sort-value=1  | Ted Budd (R)

|-
! data-sort-value="Ohio 0" |
|  data-sort-value=5 | R+5
|  | Steve Chabot (R)
|  data-sort-value=59.2 | 59.2% R
| 
| 
| 
| 
| 
| 
| data-sort-value=1  | Steve Chabot (R)

|-
! data-sort-value="Ohio 0" |
|  data-sort-value=12 | R+12
|  | Bob Gibbs (R)
|  data-sort-value=64.0 | 64.0% R
| 
| 
| 
| 
| 
| 
| data-sort-value=1  | Bob Gibbs (R)

|-
! 
|  data-sort-value=4 | R+4
|  | Mike Turner (R)
|  data-sort-value=64.1 | 64.1% R
| 
| 
| 
| 
| 
| 
| data-sort-value=1  | Mike Turner (R)

|-
! 
|  data-sort-value=7 | R+7
|  | Troy Balderson (R)
|  data-sort-value=50.1 | 50.1% R
| 
| 
| 
| 
| 
| 
| data-sort-value=1  | Troy Balderson (R)

|-
! 
|  data-sort-value=5 | R+5
|  | David Joyce (R)
|  data-sort-value=62.6 | 62.6% R
| 
| 
| 
| 
| 
| 
| data-sort-value=1  | David Joyce (R)

|-
! 
|  data-sort-value=7 | R+7
|  | Steve Stivers (R)
|  data-sort-value=66.2 | 66.2% R
| 
| 
| 
| 
| 
| 
| data-sort-value=1  | Steve Stivers (R)

|-
! 
|  data-sort-value=8 | R+8
|  | Jim Renacci (R) 
|  data-sort-value=65.3 | 65.3% R
| 
| 
| 
| 
| 
| 
| data-sort-value=1  | Anthony Gonzalez (R)

|-
! 
|  data-sort-value=10 | R+10
|  | Steve Russell (R)
|  data-sort-value=57.1 | 57.1% R
| 
| 
| 
| 
| 
| 
| data-sort-value=-1  | Kendra Horn (D)

|-
! 
| data-sort-value=0 | EVEN
|  | Kurt Schrader (D)
|  data-sort-value=-53.6 | 53.6% D
| 
| 
| 
| 
| 
| 
| data-sort-value=-1  | Kurt Schrader (D)

|-
! data-sort-value="Pennsylvania 0" |
|  data-sort-value=1 | R+1
|  | Brian Fitzpatrick (R)
|  data-sort-value=0 |
| 
| 
| 
| 
| 
| 
| data-sort-value=1  | Brian Fitzpatrick (R)

|-
! data-sort-value="Pennsylvania 0" |
|  data-sort-value=-13 | D+13
| Vacant
|  data-sort-value=0 |
| 
| 
| 
| 
| 
| 
| data-sort-value=-1  | Mary Gay Scanlon (D)

|-
! data-sort-value="Pennsylvania 0" |
|  data-sort-value=-2 | D+2
|  | Ryan Costello (R) 
|  data-sort-value=0 |
| 
| 
| 
| 
| 
| 
| data-sort-value=-1  | Chrissy Houlahan (D)

|-
! data-sort-value="Pennsylvania 0" |
|  data-sort-value=-1 | D+1
| Vacant
|  data-sort-value=0 |
| 
| 
| 
| 
| 
| 
| data-sort-value=-1  | Susan Wild (D)

|-
! data-sort-value="Pennsylvania 0" |
|  data-sort-value=1 | R+1
|  | Matt Cartwright (D)
|  data-sort-value=0 |
| 
| 
| 
| 
| 
| 
| data-sort-value=-1  | Matt Cartwright (D)

|-
! 
|  data-sort-value=6 | R+6
|  | Scott Perry (R)
|  data-sort-value=0 |
| 
| 
| 
| 
| 
| 
| data-sort-value=1  | Scott Perry (R)

|-
! 
|  data-sort-value=14 | R+14
|  | Lloyd Smucker (R)
|  data-sort-value=0 |
| 
| 
| 
| 
| 
| 
| data-sort-value=1  | Lloyd Smucker (R)

|-
! 
|  data-sort-value=14 | R+14
|  | Conor Lamb (D) 
|  data-sort-value=0 |
| 
| 
| 
| 
| 
| 
| data-sort-value=1  | Guy Reschenthaler (R)

|-
! 
|  data-sort-value=8 | R+8
|  | Mike Kelly (R)
|  data-sort-value=0 |
| 
| 
| 
| 
| 
| 
| data-sort-value=1  | Mike Kelly (R)

|-
! 
|  data-sort-value=3 | R+3
|  | Keith Rothfus (R)
|  data-sort-value=0 |
| 
| 
| 
| 
| 
| 
| data-sort-value=-1  | Conor Lamb (D)

|-
! 
|  data-sort-value=10 | R+10
|  | Mark Sanford (R) 
|  data-sort-value=58.6 | 58.6% R
| 
| 
| 
| 
| 
| 
| data-sort-value=-1  | Joe Cunningham (D)

|-
! data-sort-value="Texas 0" |
|  data-sort-value=11 | R+11
|  | Ted Poe (R) 
|  data-sort-value=60.6 | 60.6% R
| 
| 
| 
| 
| 
| 
| data-sort-value=1  | Dan Crenshaw (R)

|-
! data-sort-value="Texas 0" |
|  data-sort-value=9 | R+9
|  | Joe Barton (R) 
|  data-sort-value=58.3 | 58.3% R
| 
| 
| 
| 
| 
| 
| data-sort-value=1  | Ron Wright (R)

|-
! data-sort-value="Texas 0" |
|  data-sort-value=7 | R+7
|  | John Culberson (R)
|  data-sort-value=56.2 | 56.2% R
| 
| 
| 
| 
| 
| 
| data-sort-value=-1  | Lizzie Fletcher (D)

|-
! 
|  data-sort-value=9 | R+9
|  | Michael McCaul (R)
|  data-sort-value=57.3 | 57.3% R
| 
| 
| 
| 
| 
| 
| data-sort-value=1  | Michael McCaul (R)

|-
! 
|  data-sort-value=10 | R+10
|  | Lamar Smith (R) 
|  data-sort-value=57.0 | 57.0% R
| 
| 
| 
| 
| 
| 
| data-sort-value=1  | Chip Roy (R)

|-
! 
|  data-sort-value=10 | R+10
|  | Pete Olson (R)
|  data-sort-value=59.5 | 59.5% R
| 
| 
| 
| 
| 
| 
| data-sort-value=1  | Pete Olson (R)

|-
! 
|  data-sort-value=1 | R+1
|  | Will Hurd (R)
|  data-sort-value=48.3 | 48.3% R
| 
| 
| 
| 
| 
| 
| data-sort-value=1  |Will Hurd (R)

|-
! 
|  data-sort-value=9 | R+9
|  | Kenny Marchant (R)
|  data-sort-value=56.2 | 56.2% R
| 
| 
| 
| 
| 
| 
| data-sort-value=1  | Kenny Marchant (R)

|-
! 
|  data-sort-value=11 | R+11
|  | Roger Williams (R)
|  data-sort-value=58.3 | 58.3% R
| 
| 
| 
| 
| 
| 
| data-sort-value=1  | Roger Williams (R)

|-
! 
|  data-sort-value=10 | R+10
|  | John Carter (R)
|  data-sort-value=58.4 | 58.4% R
| 
| 
| 
| 
| 
| 
| data-sort-value=1  | John Carter (R)

|-
! 
|  data-sort-value=5 | R+5
|  | Pete Sessions (R)
|  data-sort-value=71.1 | 71.1% R
| 
| 
| 
| 
| 
| 
| data-sort-value=-1  | Colin Allred (D)

|-
! 
|  data-sort-value=13 | R+13
|  | Mia Love (R)
|  data-sort-value=53.8 | 53.8% R
| 
| 
| 
| 
| 
| 
| data-sort-value=-1  | Ben McAdams (D)

|-
! data-sort-value="Virginia 0" |
|  data-sort-value=3 | R+3
|  | Scott Taylor (R)
|  data-sort-value=61.3 | 61.3% R
| 
| 
| 
| 
| 
| 
| data-sort-value=-1  | Elaine Luria (D)

|-
! data-sort-value="Virginia 0" |
|  data-sort-value=6 | R+6
|  | Tom Garrett (R) 
|  data-sort-value=58.2 | 58.2% R
| 
| 
| 
| 
| 
| 
| data-sort-value=1  | Denver Riggleman (R)

|-
! data-sort-value="Virginia 0" |
|  data-sort-value=6 | R+6
|  | Dave Brat (R)
|  data-sort-value=57.5 | 57.5% R
| 
| 
| 
| 
| 
| 
| data-sort-value=-1  | Abigail Spanberger (D)

|-
! 
|  data-sort-value=-1 | D+1
|  | Barbara Comstock (R)
|  data-sort-value=52.7 | 52.7% R
| 
| 
| 
| 
| 
| 
| data-sort-value=-1  | Jennifer Wexton (D)

|-
! 
|  data-sort-value=4 | R+4
|  | Jaime Herrera Beutler (R)
|  data-sort-value=61.8 | 61.8% R
| 
| 
| 
| 
| 
| 
| data-sort-value=1  | Jaime Herrera Beutler (R)

|-
! 
|  data-sort-value=8 | R+8
|  | Cathy McMorris Rodgers (R)
|  data-sort-value=59.6 | 59.6% R
| 
| 
| 
| 
| 
| 
| data-sort-value=1  | Cathy McMorris Rodgers (R)

|-
! 
| data-sort-value=0 | EVEN
|  | Dave Reichert (R) 
|  data-sort-value=60.2 | 60.2% R
| 
| 
| 
| 
| 
| 
| data-sort-value=-1  | Kim Schrier (D)

|-
! 
|  data-sort-value=17 | R+17
|  data-sort-value=0 | Alex Mooney (R)
|  data-sort-value=58.2 | 58.2% R
| 
| 
| 
| 
| 
| 
| data-sort-value=1  | Alex Mooney (R)

|-
! 
|  data-sort-value=23 | R+23
|  data-sort-value=0 |Vacant
|  data-sort-value=67.9 | 67.9% R
| 
| 
| 
| 
| 
| 
| data-sort-value=1  | Carol Miller (R)

|-
! 
|  data-sort-value=5 | R+5
|  | Paul Ryan (R) 
|  data-sort-value=65.0 | 65.0% R
| 
| 
| 
| 
| 
| 
| data-sort-value=1  | Bryan Steil (R)

|-
! 
| data-sort-value=0 | EVEN
|  | Ron Kind (D)
|  data-sort-value=-98.9 | 98.9% D
| 
| 
| 
| 
| 
| 
| data-sort-value=-1  | Ron Kind (D)

|-
! 
|  data-sort-value=8 | R+8
|  | Glenn Grothman (R)
|  data-sort-value=57.2 | 57.2% R
| 
| 
| 
| 
| 
| 
| data-sort-value=1  | Glenn Grothman (R)

|-

! colspan=4 | Overall
|  | D - 210R - 19430 tossups
|  | D - 214R - 20219 tossups
|  | D - 228R - 2070 tossups
|  | D - 203R - 19438 tossups
|  | D - 206R - 19930 tossups
|  | D - 220R - 19718 tossups
|  | D - 235 R - 199 1 voided
|- valign=top
! District
! 2017 CPVI
! Incumbent
! Previous result
! Cook
! I.E.
! Sab.
! RCP
! Daily Kos
! 538
! Winner

Generic ballot polls 

The following is a list of generic party ballot polls conducted in advance of the 2018 House of Representatives elections.

Notes

References 

House